There are currently four elements in the Women's Artistic Gymnastics Code of Points named after American gymnast Simone Biles: one on vault, one on balance beam, and two on floor exercise.

Vault

Biles

History 
Biles debuted her vault, a roundoff, back handspring with half turn entry; front stretched somersault with 2 twists (an upgrade from the Cheng) at the selection camp for the 2018 World Championships. During qualifications at the 2018 World Championships Biles successfully landed the new vault and it was therefore named after her and assigned a difficulty value of 6.4, tying it as the most difficult vault in Women's Artistic Gymnastics with the Produnova.

Yurchenko double pike

History 
At the 2021 U.S. Classic Biles debuted a Yurchenko double pike vault, which no woman had ever competed before.  She submitted the skill to be added to the code of points at the Olympic Games in Tokyo.  It was assigned a difficulty of 6.6, which would make it the most difficult vault in Women's Artistic Gymnastics.  However, Biles did not perform the vault as she withdrew from most event finals after experiencing "the twisties", a psychological phenomenon causing a gymnast to lose air awareness while performing twisting elements, throughout the Olympics.  As of   this vault is still not officially in the code of points.

Balance beam

Biles

History 
Biles first started training the double-twisting double-tucked salto backwards dismount off of the balance beam in 2013; however she never performed it during the 2013–16 quad including the Olympics. Prior to making her comeback Biles posted a video, teasing new upgrades including the double-double dismount off of the balance beam. Biles debuted the new dismount at the 2019 U.S. National Championships. She submitted it as a new skill at the 2019 World Championships where it was given the rating H, the highest rating of any skill performed on the balance beam. Biles expressed disappointment at the skill being undervalued, citing similar maneuvers on different apparatuses and their ratings:

USA Gymnastics backed Biles, also expressing that the skill did not receive the rating it merited; during domestic events over the summer, USAG assigned the skill a provisional I rating. The FIG explained that the reason for the lower than expected rating is due to safety concerns due to the "added risk in landing of double saltos for Beam dismounts (with/without twists), including a potential landing on the neck." Many people made counterpoints to the FIG's concern over safety. British gymnast Ruby Harrold made the point that FIG does not "allow a warm-up immediately prior to event finals" and others cited how Jamaican gymnast Danusia Francis has frequently been denied being able to have an extra mat to make her balance beam dismount safer. Some argued that Biles was being penalized for being able to safely perform skills that are so difficult that it would be reckless for other gymnasts to even attempt them. However, others noted that Biles is not the first gymnast to have a skill undervalued by the FIG Women's Technical Committee and that several of her other eponymous skills are rated correctly. While the skill was not rated as highly as Biles hoped, it remains the highest-valued skill on balance beam in the Code of Points.

Despite the rating controversy, Biles successfully performed the new dismount during qualifications at the 2019 World Championships and the skill was therefore named after her.

Floor exercise

Biles

History 
Biles debuted her new floor exercise skill, a double layout with a half twist, at podium training for the 2013 U.S. Classic, eight years after London Phillips completed it domestically in 2005.  Biles was able to successfully complete the skill at the 2013 World Championships and the skill was therefore named after her.  Six years later Trinity Thomas performed the Biles successfully at the 2019 U.S. National Championships, becoming the third woman to complete the skill.  Gabrielle Clark completed the Biles in 2021 at the LA Gold gymnastic meet in Baton Rouge, Louisiana.

Gymnasts who have completed the Biles (FX) 

Biles II

History 
Biles first started training a triple-twisting double-tucked salto backwards (upgraded from a Silivas) in 2013.  During podium training at the 2019 U.S. Classic she performed it; however she did not perform it during the competition.  The first time Biles completed the maneuver in competition was at the 2019 U.S. National Championships.  She joined the likes of Ri Jong Song of North Korea and Kenzo Shirai and Kohei Uchimura, both of Japan, in becoming one of only a handful of individuals who has successfully performed the skill.

At the 2019 World Championships Biles successfully completed the skill during qualification and it was therefore named after her and given the rating J, making it the highest rated skill across all apparatuses in Women's Artistic Gymnastics.

During podium training at the 2021 U.S. Classic Carey performed the laid-out version of this skill, which she submitted to be added to the code of points at the 2020 Olympic Games. It was assigned a difficulty of K; however Carey never competed the skill during competition.

References

Biles
Biles
Biles